The Oxford University Chess Club (OUCC) was founded at the University of Oxford in 1869. It is the oldest university chess club in the United Kingdom. The Club meets each Wednesday evening during University term time. They field two teams in the Oxfordshire Chess League.

Foundation 
On the day of the foundation of OUCC, the minutes book recorded:

 April 30th, [1869] – This day is memorable as being the date of the foundation of the Club, which was started under the auspices of the Reverend C. E. Ranken, of Wadham College, who was chosen as the first President. E. F. Linton, University, was elected Treasurer, and W. Braithwaite, Wadham, Secretary. A code of rules was drawn up, and the Club, having received its constitution, entered upon what we trust will prove to be a long and glorious career. No less than one hundred and three names were entered upon the first list of members. Amongst others were those of Lord Randolph Churchill, Merton, E. Anthony, Christ Church ("one of the best pupils Steinitz turned out"), E.W.B. Nicholson, Trinity, the present Bodleian Librarian, Lord Garvagh, Canon Grey, Christ Church &c., &c. The meetings were held weekly on Wednesdays, and the early members appear to have been more desirous of playing one another than of engaging in foreign matches.

Prince Leopold, later Duke of Albany (1853–1884) (and son of Queen Victoria) was President of OUCC in 1875.

Varsity match
The annual Varsity Match against Cambridge University was originally suggested by Howard Staunton in 1853. It has been held annually since 1873 and is the oldest fixture on the chess calendar. Edwin Anthony, then President of the Club, and Wilhelm Steinitz were responsible for establishing the match.

With a twenty-year perspective on the matches, Henry Bird wrote that the greatest of the matches were the first two, held in 1873 and 1874 at the City of London Chess Club, City Restaurant (Perrott's), 34 Milk-street, Cheapside.  The first match was said to have had 600 to 800 spectators and the second no fewer than 700, thought to be record attendance at any chess tournament up to that time.  Each team consisted of seven players, and sand glasses were used to time some of the games at the limit of 20 moves per hour.  Oxford won the first year, and Cambridge the second.

The 1874 match was attended by nearly every London chess luminary of the time, including Howard Staunton, Wilhelm Steinitz (officiated as an umpire), Johann Löwenthal, Bernhard Horwitz, Johannes Zukertort, Henry Bird, Joseph Henry Blackburne, Cecil Valentine De Vere, George Alcock MacDonnell,  Samuel Boden, Patrick Thomas Duffy, Adolf Zytogorski, John Wisker, and others. In addition to the university match, the event included two exhibitions. Zukertort played six blindfold games (+2−1=3) and Blackburne played a seven-board simultaneous exhibition with fresh opponents starting on the boards as the games finished for a total of 20 games (+17−3=0).

Oxford won the 2011 match, the 129th official contest, 4.5-3.5 to bring the overall score to Cambridge 66 Oxford 63.

Other events
 On 2 December 1944 a famous 12-board match took place between OUCC and Bletchley Chess Club whose members consisted of the Bletchley Park code-breakers. Bletchley won 8-4 with C.H.O’D. Alexander and Harry Golombek on boards 1 and 2.
On 15 February 2004 OUCC beat Wales  6-2.
 OUCC 1sts won the 2004-05 Oxfordshire Chess League and David Shaw, top board, was awarded the prize for best player with a remarkable 9/10.
OUCC 2nds won the 2006-07 Oxfordshire Chess League.
On 18 February 2012 OUCC won the 2nds varsity match against Cambridge 5.5-4.5.

Notable games

In 1978 a memorable upset occurred when IM Michael Basman beat Oxford postgraduate GM John Nunn with the Grob.

Michael Basman vs. John Nunn, Oxford, 1978

1. g4 d5 2. h3 e5 3. d3 Bd6 4. c4 c6 5. Nc3 Ne7 6. Nf3 h5 7. gxh5 Rxh5 8. Bd2 a6 9. e4 dxc4 10. dxc4 Nd7 11. Ng5 Nf6 12. Qf3 Ng6 13. O-O-O Qe7 14. Kb1 Nf4 15. Rg1 Kf8 16. Ne2 Ne6 17. Nxe6+ Bxe6 18. Ng3 Rh8 19. Bg5 Rd8 20. Be2 Rxh3 21. Qg2 Bc7 22. Nh5 Rxd1+ 23. Rxd1 Rxh5 24. Bxh5 Qb4 25. Be2 Bxc4 26. Bxc4 Qxc4 27. Bxf6 gxf6 28. Qg4 Qe6 29. Qxe6 fxe6 30. Rd7 1-0

Notable members and officers

Notable members
 Prince Leopold, Duke of Albany
 Lord Randolph Churchill
 Wilhelm Steinitz
 Theodore Tylor
 Adrian Hollis
 Leonard Barden
 Peter Lee
 Jon Speelman
 John Nunn
 David Norwood
 Graham Russell Mitchell
 Peter Wells
 Luke McShane
 Jonathan Rowson
 Richard Palliser
 Amon Simutowe

Officers

President
First president of the club was founder Rev. Charles E. Ranken. At his peak, he was the 24th best player in the world - a grandmaster by today's standards. The office, which was at first termly, has been annual since 1884.

Treasurer

Secretary

References

Chess clubs in the United Kingdom
Chess in England
Chess Club
Organizations established in 1869
1869 in chess
1869 establishments in England